Sarah Longwell is a Republican political strategist and publisher of the neoconservative news and opinion website The Bulwark. She is the founder of Republican Voters Against Trump (now the Republican Accountability Project), which spent millions of dollars to defeat President Trump in 2020. According to The New Yorker, Longwell has "dedicated her career to fighting Trump’s takeover of her party."

Early life and education 
Longwell grew up in a Republican town in central Pennsylvania. She is a 2002 graduate of Kenyon College, where she studied political science.

Career
After graduation from Kenyon College in 2002, Longwell worked for the Intercollegiate Studies Institute, a conservative group in Delaware.

In 2005, Longwell moved to Washington, D.C., where she found a job with Richard Berman, a Republican lobbyist and later PR expert who runs several industry-funded nonprofit lobbying and PR organizations.  Over the next 15 years she worked at Berman and Company and became senior vice president and communications director, leading media campaigns on a wide range of public policy issues. Longwell also served as managing director of the American Beverage Institute, a trade association set up by Berman that lobbies on behalf of the alcohol industry, such as by arguing that the risks of drunk driving have been exaggerated and laws that have been adopted to reduce it are ineffective or inappropriate and opposing the lowering of the blood alcohol concentration limit for Driving Under the Influence (DUI) in Utah. According to Berman, "Sarah always had a knife in her teeth".

Longwell also became the first female national board chair of the Log Cabin Republicans. Longwell was instrumental in persuading the Log Cabin Republicans to refrain from endorsing then-candidate Donald Trump in 2016. In 2019, the Log Cabin Republicans endorsed President Trump for re-election and Longwell resigned as board chair.

That same year, Longwell left Berman and Company to start her own communications firm, Longwell Partners, headquartered in Washington, D.C. She also became publisher of The Bulwark, a conservative website that opposes President Trump's agenda, bringing together a moderate coalition of traditional conservatives and libertarians.

Longwell is a prominent voice in the Never Trump movement. She was instrumental in founding Defending Democracy Together, an umbrella organization for Republican Voters Against Trump, Republicans for the Rule of Law, and other anti-Trump projects. Longwell advocated for the impeachment and removal of President Trump in 2019, and for his impeachment and conviction in 2021.

Defending Democracy Together 
In 2017, Longwell was invited to participate in a session of the "Meeting of the Concerned," a quasi-secret group of Republicans who were unhappy with the direction their party had taken, where she met Bill Kristol. After the firing of FBI Director James Comey, which triggered the Mueller investigation, Kristol and Longwell formed Republicans for the Rule of Law. In 2018, she launched a nonprofit organization in response to President Donald Trump's attacks on Robert Mueller. The group, Defending Democracy Together,  was the umbrella organization for Rule of Law.

During the 2020 election, Defending Democracy Together also served as the umbrella organization for Republican Voters Against Trump, which collected testimonials from former Trump supporters and other Republicans who opposed the Trump presidency. The group spent more than $35 million to oppose President Trump, promoting those testimonials via social media advertising, billboard campaigns, and other tactics in key battleground states. In Longwell's words: “People want to be counted, people want to be on the record saying they, in this moment, stood up against Trump".

After Trump's defeat in the 2020 election, Republican Voters Against Trump rebranded itself as the Republican Accountability Project, targeting Republicans who spread falsehoods about the integrity of the election. In January 2021, the group launched a $1 million billboard campaign, calling on House Minority Leader Kevin McCarthy (R-CA), Sen. Ted Cruz (R-TX), and others to resign for continuing to support Trump in the lead-up to the January 6th Capitol riots. As Longwell put it, “The goal is to not allow these officials to memory-hole the fact that they pushed this lie, which incited the attack on the Capitol.”

The Bulwark 
In 2018, Longwell launched The Bulwark, a neoconservative opinion website, with the help of Kristol and conservative radio host Charlie Sykes. Initially launching as a news aggregator with anti-Trump content, the website revamped into a news and opinion destination, using digital staffers from the now-defunct The Weekly Standard. By 2019, The Bulwark had raised about $1 million to establish a "rational, non-Trumpist forum".

As publisher of The Bulwark, Longwell often guest-writes columns for the website, analyzing political news of the day and pushing back against the pro-Trump movement. In February 2021, she lamented the role of certain Republicans in the Capitol riots, urging Americans to "never forget who the enemies of democracy were". Longwell supports "principled conservatism", claiming "hope is not lost, people are mostly good (regardless of who they vote for), and that America is going to be okay".

Longwell also co-hosts The Secret Podcast with Jonathan V. Last and The Next Level Podcast with Last and Tim Miller.

Personal life
Longwell is lesbian; she married in 2013. In 2016, Longwell and her wife had their first child.

References

External links

LGBT conservatism in the United States
Kenyon College alumni
Lesbian politicians
Living people
21st-century publishers (people)
Place of birth missing (living people)
Year of birth missing (living people)
American publishers (people)
LGBT people from Pennsylvania